Adumdé  is a small town in the Bimah Prefecture of Kara Region of Togo. It is located 76 kilometres from Kara. It has a population of around 9,700.

Populated places in Kara Region